Setae or Setai, or Settae or Settai (Σέτται), or Saettae or Saittai or Saittae (Σαίτται) was a town of ancient Lydia, located at Sidas Kaleh in Modern Turkey. The ruins of that town consist of a stadium, tombs and ruins of several temples. The town is not mentioned by any of the earlier writers, but appears in Ptolemy and Hierocles.

Location
The city lying between the upper reaches of the River Hermus and its tributary the Hyllus, and was part of the Katakekaumene. 

Its site is located at Sidas Kale, near İcikler in Asiatic Turkey.

History
The city struck coins and was visited by the Emperor Hadrian.

The Apollo Aksyros Temple located in the ancient city. According to the researchers in one of the stele of the temple, there is an inscription which writes "Melita and Makedon stole Eia’s fishnet and other belongings. Therefore, they were punished by God. Their parents consulted Apollon Aksyros for their sake and made a vow,"

Bishopric
Saittae was also the seat of a Byzantine Bishopric. Bishop Limenius signed the Chalcedon Creed while Bishop 
Amachius spoke at the Council of Chalcedon. Limenius signed the documents at the Council of Ephesus.  Although an Islamic area now, under the name Saittae it remains a titular see of the Roman Catholic Church.

References

Ancient Greek archaeological sites in Turkey
Populated places in ancient Lydia
Former populated places in Turkey
Roman towns and cities in Turkey
Populated places of the Byzantine Empire
History of Manisa Province
Catholic titular sees in Asia